Patoptoformis hanuman is a species of moth of the family Cossidae. It is found in India (Assam).

Etymology
The species is named from Hanuman, a sacral monkey in Indian mythology.

References

External links

Moths described in 2006
Moths of Asia
Cossinae